This is a chronologic list of representative anthropologically-minded films and filmmakers:

Alfred C. Haddon  – UK
Torres Strait Expedition, 1898
Edward S. Curtis – US
In the Land of the Head Hunters, 1916
Zora Neale Hurston - US
Fieldwork Footage, 1928
Commandment Keeper Church, Beaufort South Carolina, May 1940
Percy Powell-Cotton - UK
Crafts in the Cameroons, 1931
Gorilla Drive, Cameroons, 1931
Osonigbe Juju House and Benin Brass Cutting, 1931
Robert J. Flaherty – US
Nanook of the North, 1922
Moana, 1926
Tabu, 1931
Man of Aran, 1934
Louisiana Story, 1948
José Leitão de Barros – Portugal
Maria do Mar, 1930
Ala-Arriba!, 1942
Jean Epstein – Poland
L'or des mers (The ocean's gold), 1932
Diana and Antoinette Powell-Cotton - UK
Angola: Dombondola Potter, 1936
Angola: Scenes from a household (Dombondola), 1936
Margaret Mead - US
Trance and Dance in Bali (Trance and Dance in Bali), 1937
Jean Rouch – France
Les Maîtres Fous (The Mad Masters), 1954
Moi, un noir, 1958
Chronique d’un été (Chronicle of a Summer), 1961
Jaguar, 1954–1967
Petit à petit, 1972
Lionel Rogosin – US
On the Bowery, 1957
Come Back, Africa, 1957
John Marshall – US
The Hunters, 1957
N!ai: The Story of a !Kung Woman, 1980
A Kalahari Family, 1951–2000
António Campos – Portugal
A Almadraba atuneira (Tuna net), 1961
Vilarinho das Furnas, 1971
Histórias selvagens (Savage stories), 1978
Falamos de Rio de Onor (Let’s talk about Rio de Onor)
Gente da Praia da Vieira (The people of Praia da Vieira), 1976
Terra fria (Cold land), 1992
Manoel de Oliveira – Portugal
Acto da Primavera (Act of Spring), 1963
Michel Brault – Canada
Pour la suite du monde, 1963
Orders (Les Ordres) 1975
The Paper Wedding (Les Noces de papier), 1990
Pierre Perrault – Canada
Pour la suite du monde, 1963
Robert Gardner – US
Dead Birds, 1964
The Nuer, 1970
Rivers of Sand, 1975
Sons of Shiva, 1985
Forest of Bliss, 1986
David MacDougall and Judith MacDougall – Australia
To Live with Herds, 1968/1972
Nawi, 1968/1970
The Wedding Camels, 1974/1977
Lorang's Way, 1974/1979
A Wife Among Wives, 1974/1981
Three Horsemen, 1978/1982
Stockman's Strategy, 1982/1984
Collum Calling Canberra, 1982/1984
Doon School Chronicles, 1997-1998/2000
Diyas, 1997/2000
Tim Asch – US
The Feast, 1969
Yanomamo: A Multidisciplinary Study, 1971
Magical Death, 1974
The Ax Fight, 1975
A Man Called "Bee": Studying the Yanomamo, 1975
A Balinese Trance Seance, 1979
Jero on Jero: A Balinese Trance Seance Observed, 1980
Jero Tapakan: Stories From the Life of a Balinese Healer, 1983
The Medium is the Masseuse: A Balinese Massage, 1983
The Water of Words: A Cultural Ecology of an Eastern Indonesian Island, 1983
Spear and Sword: a Ceremonial Payment of Bridewealth, 1989
Releasing the Spirits, 1990
A Celebration of Origins, 1992
António Reis and Margarida Cordeiro – Portugal
Trás-os-Montes, 1976
Ana, 1984
Noémia Delgado – Portugal
Máscaras (Masks), 1976
Bob Connolly and Robin Anderson
First Contact, 1983
Joe Leahy’s Neighbors, 1988
Black Harvest, 1991
Dennis O'Rourke – Australia
Yumi Yet – Independence for Papua New Guinea, 1976
Ileksen – Politics in Papua New Guinea, 1978
Yap ... How Did you Know We’d Like TV, 1980
The Shark Callers of Kontu, 1982
Couldn't Be Fairer, 1984
Half Life: A Parable for the Nuclear Age, 1985
Cannibal Tours, 1988
The Good Woman of Bangkok, 1991
Cunnamulla, 2000
Land Mines -- A Love Story, 2004
John Melville Bishop - US
Rhesus Play, 1977
YoYo Man, 1978
The Land Where The Blues Began, 1979
New England Fiddles & New England Dances, 1983
The Last Window, 1987
Himalayan Herders, 1997
Hosay Trinidad (1999)
Oh What A Blow That Phantom Gave Me, 2003, (with Harald E.L. Prins)
Oss Tales, 2007
John Bishop Short Films, (14 films 1975-2007)
Pedro Costa – Portugal
Casa de Lava (Down to Earth), 1994
Ossos (Bones), 1997
No Quarto da Vanda (In Vanda’s room), 2000
Juventude em Marcha (Colossal youth), 2006
Flora Gomes – Guiné-Bissau
Po di Sangui, 1996
Nha Fala, 2002
Ziba Mir-Hosseini and Kim Longinotto - Iran/UK
Divorce Iranian Style, 1998
Runaway, 2001
Ruth Behar - Cuba/US
Adio Kerida (Goodbye Dear Love) 2002
Fernando Meirelles – Brazil
Cidade de Deus, (City of God), 2002
Randy Olson
Flock of Dodos, 2006
Oh, What a Blow that Phantom Gave Me! 2003 (with John Bishop)
Harjant Gill - US / India
Milind Soman Made Me Gay, 2007
Roots of Love, 2011
Mardistan/Macholand, 2014
Sent Away Boys, 2016
Véréna Paravel and Lucien Castaing-Taylor- France/UK
Leviathan, 2012
somniloquies, 2017
Caniba, 2017
Robert Lemelson – US
40 Years of Silence: An Indonesian Tragedy, 2009
Afflictions: Culture and Mental Health in Indonesia Film Series, 2010 / 2011
Shadows and Illuminations, 2010
Family Victim, 2010
The Bird Dancer, 2010
Kites and Monsters, 2011
Memory of My Face, 2011
Ritual Burdens, 2011
Jathilan: Trance and Possession in Java, 2011
Ngaben: Emotion and Restraint in a Balinese Heart, 2012
Standing on the Edge of a Thorn, 2012

References

Anthropology visual
Anthropology documentary films